Vaucluse is a historic plantation house located near Bridgetown, Northampton County, Virginia. It is a complex, two-story, ell-shaped brick and frame structure with a gable roof.  Attached to the house is a -story quarter kitchen with brick ends.  The brickended section of the house was built about 1784, with the addition to the house added in 1829.  The annex connecting the house with the old kitchen was probably added in 1889.  It was the home of Secretary of State Abel P. Upshur (1790–1844) who died in the USS Princeton disaster of 1844. His brother U.S. Navy Commander George P. Upshur (1799–1852), owned nearby Caserta from 1836 to 1847.

It was listed on the National Register of Historic Places in 1970.

References

External links
Vaucluse, State Route 619, Bridgetown, Northampton County, VA 2 photos at Historic American Buildings Survey

Historic American Buildings Survey in Virginia
Plantation houses in Virginia
Houses on the National Register of Historic Places in Virginia
Houses completed in 1784
Houses in Northampton County, Virginia
National Register of Historic Places in Northampton County, Virginia
1784 establishments in Virginia